Dick Kooijman (born 10 November 1972 in Wijk bij Duurstede) is a Dutch footballer currently playing for AGOVV Apeldoorn in the Eerste Divisie. He played as a defensive midfielder.

Biography
Kooijman's football career began with Heracles Almelo in the 1993-94 season. The next season Kooijman played with FC Groningen and later with AZ from 1995 until 1997. FC Emmen was his next club where he played until 1999.  Following that club, he moved to Go Ahead Eagles until 2003.  He was transferred to De Graafschap where he played until 2005. 

Kooijman moved to SDC Putten in the 2005-06 season. He switched to AGOVV Apeldoorn in 2006. Kooijman played in Sparta Nijkerk in 2007–08.

References

1972 births
Living people
AZ Alkmaar players
Dutch footballers
People from Wijk bij Duurstede
SDC Putten players
Association football midfielders
Sparta Nijkerk players
Footballers from Utrecht (province)
Heracles Almelo players
De Graafschap players
FC Groningen players
AGOVV Apeldoorn players
FC Emmen players
Go Ahead Eagles players